Marcus Pløen (11 August 1778 – 11 July 1836) was a Norwegian timber merchant and politician.

References

1778 births
1836 deaths
19th-century Norwegian politicians
Norwegian businesspeople in timber